Al Riyadi Club Beirut is a multi-sports club based in Manara, a district in Beirut, Lebanon. Founded in 1934, the basketball team competes in the Lebanese Basketball League.

The multi-sports club, which is  mainly known for their basketball program, also plays ping-pong, martial arts, and other sports. Al Riyadi is the most titled Lebanese basketball club, with 29 league titles, two FIBA Asia Champions Cups and five Arab Club Championships. The basketball team plays its home games at the Riyadi Club Court in Beirut.

Achievements 

Lebanese Basketball League
Winners (29): 1949–50, 1950–51, 1951–52, 1952–53, 1953–54, 1955–56, 1956–57, 1957–58, 1958–59, 1959–60, 1967–68, 1970–71, 1972–73, 1992–93, 1994–95, 1996–97, 2004–05, 2005–06, 2006–07, 2007–08, 2008–09, 2009–10, 2010–11, 2013–14, 2014–15, 2015–16, 2016–17, 2018–19, 2020–21
Lebanese Basketball Cup
Winners (4): 2005–06, 2006–07, 2007–08, 2018–19
Lebanese Basketball Supercup
Winners (2): 2011–12, 2018–19
FIBA Asia Champions Cup
Winners (2): 2011, 2017
 Arab Club Basketball Championship
 Winners (5): 2005, 2006, 2007, 2009, 2010
WABA Champions Cup
Winners (4): 1998, 2008, 2011, 2017

Current roster

See also 
Lebanon national basketball team

Notes

References

External links 
 
 Lebanese Basketball Federation website

Al Riyadi Club Beirut
1934 establishments in Lebanon
Basketball teams established in 1934
Basketball teams in Lebanon
Sport in Beirut